Braeden Campbell (born 4 February 2002) is an Australian rules footballer who plays for the Sydney Swans in the Australian Football League (AFL). He was recruited by the Sydney Swans with the 5th draft pick in the 2020 AFL draft. after the Swans matched a bid from Hawthorn.

Early football

Campbell was a Westbrook Juniors AFL Club player who progressed through to Pennant Hills Senior AFL club as a junior then elevated into  the Premier Division team.  He won the club's Best First Year player award in the 2020 season.

He was educated at Knox Grammar School.

AFL career
In his second game, he  earned himself a Rising Star nomination for his 25 disposal performance against the Adelaide Crows.

Statistics
Updated to the end of the 2022 season.

|- 
| 2021 ||  || 16
| 8 || 1 || 2 || 71 || 41 || 112 || 26 || 11 || 0.1 || 0.3 || 8.9 || 5.1 || 14.0 || 3.3 || 1.4
|- 
| 2022 ||  || 16
| 14 || 2 || 2 || 96 || 34 || 130 || 34 || 28 || 0.1 || 0.1 || 6.9 || 2.4 || 9.3 || 2.4 || 2.0
|- class=sortbottom
! colspan=3 | Career
! 25 !! 3 !! 4 !! 173 !! 80 !! 253 !! 62 !! 42 !! 0.1 !! 0.2 !! 6.9 !! 3.2 !! 10.1 !! 2.5 !! 1.7
|}

Honours and achievements
Individual
 AFL Rising Star nominee: 2021 (round 2)

References

External links

2002 births
Living people
Sydney Swans players
Australian rules footballers from New South Wales
Pennant Hills Australian Football Club players
People educated at Knox Grammar School